Jacques Louis Antoine Marie David (22 December 1930 – 19 December 2018) was a French Roman Catholic bishop.

He was born in France and was ordained to the priesthood in 1956. He served as titular bishop of Girba and as auxiliary bishop of the Roman Catholic Archdiocese of Bordeaux, France, from 1981 to 1986. He served as bishop of the Roman Catholic Diocese of La Rochelle and Saintes, France, from 1986 to 1996. David served as bishop of the Roman Catholic Diocese of Évreux, France, from 1996 to 2006.

Notes

1930 births
2018 deaths
Bishops of Évreux
20th-century Roman Catholic bishops in France
21st-century Roman Catholic bishops in France